Tia-Clair Toomey-Orr (born 22 July 1993) is an Australian weightlifter and CrossFit Games athlete. After winning her sixth-consecutive title at the 2022 CrossFit Games, Toomey has more title wins than any other athlete in the history of the sport. She also won the gold medal in the women's  event at the 2018 Commonwealth Games in the Gold Coast.

Toomey also competed in the women's  event at the 2016 Summer Olympics and came in 14th. At the CrossFit Games, Toomey was runner-up in 2015 and 2016, before becoming winner of the 2017, 2018, 2019, 2020, 2021 and 2022 CrossFit Games.

Early life
Tia-Clair Toomey was born on 22 July 1993 to Debbi and Brendon Toomey in Nambour, Queensland, Australia, the eldest of three girls. She grew up in Dunethin Rock along the Maroochy River on the Sunshine Coast, where her parents worked on a cane farm.  She attended a primary school in North Arm, Queensland. When she was 12, the family moved to Weipa after the sugarcane mill closed. She studied at Western Cape College in Weipa, and then boarded at the Townsville Grammar School in Townsville in 2009.  After finishing school in 2011, she went to study nursing at Queensland University of Technology in Brisbane. However, she left after six months and moved to Gladstone to be with her future husband Shane Orr. There she worked for a time as a dental assistant, and then as a lab technician at a Rio Tinto facility.

Toomey competed in athletics as a runner while she was at school. When she was in Gladstone, she focused on 400m hurdling, and was introduced to CrossFit by Shane Orr who had used it to supplement his training while he was playing for Gladstone Rugby Union. She joined a CrossFit gym and became involved in the sport; soon after she started participating in CrossFit competitions in 2013. She learned the basics of weightlifting through her CrossFit classes.

Competitions

CrossFit Games
Toomey first competed in the CrossFit Open less than a month after learning CrossFit in 2013. The following year she qualified for the Regionals, but was only ranked 18th in the Australian Regional. Toomey first qualified for the CrossFit Games in 2015 after two years of CrossFit competitions.  She finished runner-up to Katrín Davíðsdóttir in her debut year, and was named Rookie of the Year.

At the 2016 CrossFit Games, the women's competition was tightly fought between Davíðsdóttir and Toomey, but Toomey was again placed second after Davíðsdóttir managed to hold off a strong challenge from Toomey to win a second time.

The 2017 CrossFit Games was again a close-fought competition, this time between Toomey and fellow Australian Kara Webb. Significantly, Webb was penalized after a judging error which resulted in dropped points for Webb in the penultimate event. Toomey won her first Games in a tight finish, beating Webb by only two points.

At the 2018 Games, Toomey won convincingly with a 64-point lead over second-place Laura Horvath. The following year in the 2019 Games, she won with a large margin of 195 points over Kristin Holte, and became the first woman to win three CrossFit Games.

In 2020, Toomey extended her record to four consecutive wins.  Her performance in 2020 was the most dominant display ever by a female CrossFit athlete at the Games, winning 9 of the 12 events in the final stage at the Games, with a margin of victory of 360 points over Katrín Davíðsdóttir.

Toomey further extended the number of titles won to five at the 2021 CrossFit Games with another dominant display, winning 9 out of 15 events at the Games and setting a record score of 1,435. The five wins equalled the record set by Mat Fraser, and she also broke Fraser's record of 29 total event wins by setting a new record of 33 event wins.

Toomey won her sixth title, and $310,000 prize money, at the 2022 CrossFit Games. Her win made her the only person to win six individual CrossFit Games title. She placed first in two of thirteen events at the competition.

Toomey has indicated that she would not be competing at the 2023 CrossFit Games due to pregnancy, nevertheless she took part in the Open that season while pregnant.

Olympics
Toomey lifted her then-personal best  clean and jerk at a CrossFit competition in September 2013 after training for only 6 months, and her performance caught the attention of the weightlifting coach Miles Wydall. He later offered to coach Toomey on weightlifting and encouraged Toomey to try to get to the Rio Olympics representing Australia.

In December 2020, Toomey announced her plan to train with the Australian bobsleigh team and try to qualify for the 2022 Winter Olympics to be held in China. In her first bobsled competition in South Korea in February 2021, she won two races as brakewoman in a two-woman bobsled team. Her team qualified for the Winter Olympic in January 2022, however, they were not selected for the Australian team due to regulations that the new event monobob and the 2-woman team must have the same driver, and the monobob driver Bree Walker was favoured and chosen.

Commonwealth Games
Toomey also competed in weightlifting at the 2018 Commonwealth Games.

Personal life
Toomey met her husband and coach, Shane Orr, while she was still in high school and they were both participating in a local triathlon event in Weipa, later introduced to each other at a fishing competition. They married in 2017. Toomey announced her pregnancy in December 2022, and that she would not compete in the 2023 Games.

Toomey and Orr owned a gym in Gladstone, which they sold in early 2019 after they moved to Cookeville, Tennessee in early October 2018 to train at Rich Froning's gym CrossFit Mayhem. Multiple CrossFit Games male champion, Mat Fraser, then trained with them in Cookeville and Shane coached both of them in preparation for the 2019 and 2020 CrossFit Games. She moved in 2021 to Nashville, Tennessee used as a base for PRVN Fitness training camp where her husband is head coach.

She appeared in a Super Bowl LV commercial along with fellow CrossFitter Josh Bridges.

CrossFit Games results

Honours and awards
 Sports Illustrated, Fittest 50: 2022 (No. 1)

References

Bibliography

External links

Tia-Clair Toomey-Orr on Instagram

1993 births
Living people
People from Gladstone, Queensland
Australian female weightlifters
Commonwealth Games gold medallists for Australia
Commonwealth Games medallists in weightlifting
Olympic weightlifters of Australia
Weightlifters at the 2016 Summer Olympics
Place of birth missing (living people)
CrossFit athletes
Weightlifters from Brisbane
Weightlifters at the 2018 Commonwealth Games
21st-century Australian women
Medallists at the 2018 Commonwealth Games